Gabriel Rodrigues Noga (born 25 January 2002) is a Brazilian footballer who plays as a centre back for Campeonato Brasileiro Série A club Flamengo.

Career

Flamengo

Atlético Goianiense (loan)
On 29 March 2022 Noga was loaned to Atlético Goianiense until 31 December 2022. He only managed to had 3 total appearances and returned to Flamengo earlier than expected.

Bahia (loan)
On 27 July 2022 Flamengo loaned Noga to Bahia until 31 December 2022.

Career statistics

Honours

Club
Flamengo
Campeonato Brasileiro Série A: 2020
Campeonato Carioca: 2021

International
Brazil U17
FIFA U-17 World Cup: 2019

References

2002 births
Living people
Brazilian footballers
Brazil youth international footballers
Association football defenders
Campeonato Brasileiro Série A players
Campeonato Brasileiro Série B players
CR Flamengo footballers
Atlético Clube Goianiense players
Esporte Clube Bahia players
People from Volta Redonda
Sportspeople from Rio de Janeiro (state)